Suri may refer to:

Places
 Suri, Birbhum, a town in West Bengal, India
 Suri I, community development block in West Bengal, India
 Suri II, community development block in West Bengal, India
 Suri Sadar subdivision, administrative subdivision in West Bengal, India
 Suri (Vidhan Sabha constituency), an assembly constituency in Birbhum district in the Indian state of West Bengal
 Suri dynasty, a former South Asian empire
 Şuri, a commune in Drochia District, Moldova
 Suri, Hamadan, a village in Hamadan Province, Iran
 Suri, Khuzestan, a village in Khuzestan Province, Iran
 Suri, Lorestan, a village in Lorestan Province, Iran
 Suri, West Azerbaijan, a village in West Azerbaijan Province, Iran
 Suri, Dolakha, Gaurishankar Rural Municipality, Dolakha District, Nepal
 Sori, Kenya or Suri

People
 Suri (name)
 Sur (Pashtun tribe) or Suri, a Pashtun tribe
 Suri (Ethiopia) or Surma people
 Suri language, a Nilo-Saharan Eastern Sudanic language spoken by Suri people
 Suri (Khukhrain), one of the ten clans of the Khukhrain

Other meanings
 Suri (Peru), a mountain in Peru
 Suri (flower)
 Suri alpaca, a breed of alpaca
 Darwin's rhea, a large flightless bird in South America
 Suri, edible larva of the palm weevil, Rhynchophorus palmarum
 Suri, a lemur in the 2000 Disney animated film Dinosaur

See also
 Siri (disambiguation)
 Suri Sadar Hospital, West Bengal, India
 Surry (disambiguation)
 Unsuri (died 1039), Persian poet

Language and nationality disambiguation pages